A harbor (American English), harbour (British English; see spelling differences), or haven is a sheltered body of water where ships, boats, and barges can be docked. The term harbor is often used interchangeably with port, which is a man-made facility built for loading and unloading vessels and dropping off and picking up passengers. Ports usually include one or more harbors. Alexandria Port in Egypt is an example of a port with two harbors.

Harbors may be natural or artificial. An artificial harbor can have deliberately constructed breakwaters, sea walls, or jettys or they can be constructed by dredging, which requires maintenance by further periodic dredging. An example of an artificial harbor is Long Beach Harbor, California, United States, which was an array of salt marshes and tidal flats too shallow for modern merchant ships before it was first dredged in the early 20th century. In contrast, a natural harbor is surrounded on several sides of land. Examples of natural harbors include Sydney Harbour, New South Wales,  Australia and Trincomalee Harbour in Sri Lanka.

Definitions
As a rule, the harbor is called the water area of the port, directly adjacent to the berth am, where the loading and unloading of ships, embarkation and disembarkation of passengers are carried out. Also in the harbor, ships can be at a long anchorage at the pier or at anchor. For this purpose, special places for anchorage will be equipped on the territory of the harbor.

The harbor can be artificial or natural. For a natural harbor, choose a place well protected from waves and wind, surrounded on several sides by land areas.

An artificial harbor usually has purpose-built breakwaters, and dredging is also used in the construction of artificial harbors. Natural harbors require maintenance through periodic depth measurements and, if necessary, further periodic dredging. An example of an artificial harbor is Long Beach Harbor, California, USA, which was an array of salt marshes and tidal banks too shallow for modern merchant ships. At the beginning of the 20th century, dredging works were carried out here.

Artificial harbors  

Artificial harbors are frequently built for use as ports. The oldest artificial harbor known is the Ancient Egyptian site at Wadi al-Jarf, on the Red Sea coast, which is at least 4500 years old (ca. 2600-2550 BCE, reign of King Khufu). The largest artificially created harbor is Jebel Ali in Dubai. Other large and busy artificial harbors include:

 Port of Houston, Texas, United States;
 Port of Long Beach, California, United States;
 Port of Los Angeles in San Pedro, California, United States.
 Port of Rotterdam, Netherlands;
 Port of Savannah, Georgia, United States;

The Ancient Carthaginians constructed fortified, artificial harbors called cothons.

Natural harbors  

A natural harbor is a landform where a section of a body of water is protected and deep enough to allow anchorage. Many such harbors are rias. Natural harbors have long been of great strategic naval and economic importance, and many great cities of the world are located on them. Having a protected harbor reduces or eliminates the need for breakwaters as it will result in calmer waves inside the harbor. Some examples are:

 Bali Strait, Indonesia
  Berehaven Harbour, Ireland 
 Balikpapan Bay in East Kalimantan, Indonesia
 Mumbai in Maharashtra, India
 Boston Harbor in Massachusetts, United States
 Burrard Inlet in Vancouver, British Columbia, Canada
 Cork Harbour, Ireland
 Grand Harbour, Malta
 Guantánamo Bay, Cuba
 Gulf of Paria, Trinidad and Tobago
 Halifax Harbour in Nova Scotia, Canada
 Hamilton Harbour in Ontario, Canada
 Killybegs in County Donegal, Ireland
 Kingston Harbour, Jamaica
 Marsamxett Harbour, Malta
 Milford Haven in Wales, United Kingdom
 New York Harbor in the United States
 Pago Pago Harbor in American Samoa
 Pearl Harbor in Hawaii, United States
 Poole Harbour in England, United Kingdom
 Port Hercules, Principality of Monaco
 Sydney Harbour in Australia, technically a ria
 Tanjung Perak in Surabaya, Indonesia
 Port of Tobruk in Tobruk, Libya
 Presque Isle Bay in Pennsylvania, United States
 Prince William Sound in Alaska, United States
 Puget Sound in Washington state, United States
 Rías Altas and Rías Baixas in Galicia, Spain
 Roadstead of Brest in Brittany, France
 San Francisco Bay in California, United States
 Scapa Flow in Scotland, United Kingdom
 Sept-Îles in Côte-Nord, in Quebec, Canada
 Shelburne in Nova Scotia, Canada
 Subic Bay in Zambales, Philippines
 Tampa Bay in Florida, United States
 Trincomalee Harbour, Sri Lanka
 Tuticorin in Tamil Nadu, India
 Victoria Harbour in Hong Kong
 Visakhapatnam Harbour, India
 Vizhinjam in Trivandrum, India
 Waitemata Harbour in Auckland, New Zealand
                                                Manukau Harbour in Auckland, New Zealand

Ice-free harbors  
For harbors near the North and South poles, being ice-free is an important advantage, especially when it is year-round. Examples of these are:

Hammerfest, Norway
Liinakhamari, Russia
Murmansk, Russia
Nakhodka in Nakhodka Bay, Russia 
Pechenga, Russia
Prince Rupert, Canada
Valdez, United States
Vardø, Norway
Vostochny Port, Russia

The world's southernmost harbor, located at Antarctica's Winter Quarters Bay (77° 50′ South), is sometimes ice-free, depending on the summertime pack ice conditions.

Important harbors  

Although the world's busiest port is a contested title, in 2017 the world's busiest harbor by cargo tonnage was the Port of Ningbo-Zhoushan.

The following are large natural harbors:

See also

Boyd's Automatic tide signalling apparatus
Dock
Ice pier
Inland harbor
List of marinas
List of seaports
Mandracchio
Marina
Mulberry harbour
Quay
Roadstead
Seaport
Shipyard
Wharf

Notes

External links

Harbor Maintenance Finance and Funding Congressional Research Service

 
Coastal construction
Nautical terminology
Bodies of water
Infrastructure
Industrial buildings

it:Porto
tt:Лиман